National Highway 312, commonly referred to as NH 312 is a national highway in India. It is a secondary route of National Highway 12,  which runs in the state of West Bengal in India.

Route 
The road connects

Murshidabad district
Jangipur, Omarpur, Lalgola, Bhagawangola, Murshidabad, Chunakhali, Islampur, Domkal, Jalangi

Nadia districts
Karimpur, Nazirpur, Haripur], Betai, Debnathpur, Tehatta, Chapra, Krishnanagar, Hanshkhali, Duttapulia

North 24 Parganas
Baneswarpur, Helencha, Bangaon, Berigopalpur Ghat, Ichamati, Tarnipur Ghat, Swarupnagar and Basirhat (Ghojadanga)

Junctions  

  Terminal near Jangipur.
  near Bangaon
  SH 3 near Bangaon

Redevelopment
The highway is expected to be completed by 2034.

See also 
 List of National Highways in India
 List of National Highways in India by state

References

External links 
 NH 312 on OpenStreetMap

National highways in India
National Highways in West Bengal